Software and Systems Modeling (SoSyM) is a peer-reviewed scientific journal covering the development and application of software and systems modeling languages and techniques, including modeling foundations, semantics, analysis and synthesis techniques, model transformations, language definition and language engineering issues. It was established in 2002 and is published by Springer Science+Business Media. The editors-in-chief are Jeff Gray (University of Alabama) and Bernhard Rumpe (RWTH Aachen University). They are supported by the associate editors Marsha Chechik (University of Toronto), Martin Gogolla (University of Bremen), and Jean-Marc Jezequel (IRISA/INRIA and University of Rennes 1) and the assistant editors Huseyin Ergin (Ball State University) and  Martin Schindler (RWTH Aachen University). The members of the editorial board can be found on http://www.sosym.org/.

Robert France was co-founder and editor-in-chief of the journal from 1999 until 2015.

According to the Journal Citation Reports, the journal has a 2018 impact factor of 2.660.

The journal is widely abstracted and indexed, for example in ACM Digital Library, DBLP, EBSCO, INSPEC, ProQuest, and SCOPUS.

References

External links
 
 Journal page at publisher's website

Publications established in 2002
Computer science journals
Systems journals
Springer Science+Business Media academic journals
Quarterly journals
English-language journals